The 2017 Malaysia Masters Grand Prix Gold was the first grand prix's badminton tournament of the 2017 BWF Grand Prix Gold and Grand Prix. The tournament was held at the Sibu Indoor Stadium in Sarawak, Malaysia from 17–22 January 2017 and had a total purse of $120,000.

Men's singles

Seeds

  Ng Ka Long (champion)
  Tanongsak Saensomboonsuk (withdrew)
  Hu Yun (second round)
  Wong Wing Ki (withdrew)
  Lee Hyun-il (final)
  Ajay Jayaram (quarterfinals)
  Tommy Sugiarto (semifinals)
  Jonatan Christie (quarterfinals)
  Iskandar Zulkarnain Zainuddin (withdrew)
  Wei Nan (first round)
  Sony Dwi Kuncoro (first round)
  Wang Tzu-wei (second round)
  Zulfadli Zulkiffli (second round)
  Brice Leverdez (second round)
  B. Sai Praneeth (withdrew)
  Ihsan Maulana Mustofa (third round)

Finals

Top half

Section 1

Section 2

Section 3

Section 4

Bottom half

Section 5

Section 6

Section 7

Section 8

Women's singles

Seeds

  Saina Nehwal (champion)
  Cheung Ngan Yi (semifinals)
  Beatriz Corrales (second round)
  Hsu Ya-ching (second round)
  Yip Pui Yin (semifinals)
  Goh Jin Wei (second round)
  Chiang Mei-hui (second round)
  Fitriani (quarterfinals)

Finals

Top half

Section 1

Section 2

Bottom half

Section 3

Section 4

Men's doubles

Seeds

  Goh V Shem / Tan Wee Kiong (withdrew)
  Lee Jhe-huei / Lee Yang (first round)
  Manu Attri / B. Sumeeth Reddy (second round)
  Fajar Alfian / Muhammad Rian Ardianto (second round)
  Ong Yew Sin / Teo Ee Yi (withdrew)
  Chooi Kah Ming / Low Juan Shen (first round)
  Or Chin Chung / Tang Chun Man (first round)
  Hoon Thien How / Teo Kok Siang (second round)

Finals

Top half

Section 1

Section 2

Bottom half

Section 3

Section 4

Women's doubles

Seeds

  Jongkolphan Kititharakul / Rawinda Prajongjai (champion)
  Chiang Kai-hsin / Hung Shih-han (quarterfinals)
 
 
  Keshya Nurvita Hanadia / Devi Tika Permatasari (quarterfinals)
  Lim Yin Loo / Yap Cheng Wen (semifinals)

Finals

Top half

Section 1

Section 2

Bottom half

Section 3

Section 4

Mixed doubles

Seeds

  Chan Peng Soon / Goh Liu Ying (withdrew)
  Tan Kian Meng / Lai Pei Jing (champion)
  Lee Chun Hei / Chau Hoi Wah (withdrew)
  Ronald Alexander / Melati Daeva Oktavianti (second round)
  Tang Chun Man / Tse Ying Suet (quarterfinals)
  Tontowi Ahmad / Gloria Emanuelle Widjaja (semifinals)
  Pranaav Jerry Chopra / N. Sikki Reddy (withdrew)
  Terry Hee / Tan Wei Han (quarterfinals)

Finals

Top half

Section 1

Section 2

Bottom half

Section 3

Section 4

References

External links 
 Tournament Link

Malaysia Masters
Malaysia
Malaysia Masters Grand Prix Gold
Sport in Sarawak